Matelea sprucei is a species of plant in the family Apocynaceae. It is endemic to Ecuador.  Its natural habitat is subtropical or tropical moist montane forests. It is threatened by habitat loss.

References

Flora of Ecuador
sprucei
Critically endangered plants
Taxonomy articles created by Polbot